The Rose of Blood is a 1917 American silent drama film directed by J. Gordon Edwards and starring Theda Bara. Based on the story "The Red Rose" by Ryszard Ordynski, the film was written by Bernard McConville. The Rose of Blood is now considered to be a lost film.

Cast
 Theda Bara as Lisza Tapenka
 Genevieve Blinn as Governess
 Charles Clary as Prince Arbassoff
 Marie Kiernan as Kosyla
 Joe King as Prime Minister
 Herschel Mayall as Koliensky
 Ryszard Ordynski as Vassea
 Hector Sarno as Revolutionist
 Bert Turner as Princess Arbassoff

Reception
Like many American films of the time, The Rose of Blood was subject to cuts by city and state film censorship boards. For example, the Chicago Board of Censors cut in Reel 2 two scenes of a young man holding a bomb and the throwing of it and the intertitle "They still live, but next time", in Reel 5, the intertitle "Nothing less than death", in Reel 6, scenes of the shooting of the general and the servant doping the wine, and in Reel 7, five riot scenes including a soldier killing a young man and a soldier clubbing an old woman, the intertitle "When are you going to pay me?", two scenes of women taking bombs from a chest, and the lighting of the fuse.

See also
List of lost films
1937 Fox vault fire

References

External links

Film still at britannica.com

1917 films
1917 drama films
Fox Film films
Silent American drama films
American silent feature films
American black-and-white films
Films based on short fiction
Films directed by J. Gordon Edwards
Lost American films
Films with screenplays by Bernard McConville
1910s American films
1910s English-language films
English-language drama films